Selby McFarlane (1891−1976) was an Australian rugby league footballer who played in the 1900s and 1910s.  He played for North Sydney in the NSWRL competition.

Playing career
McFarlane made his debut for North Sydney in the 1909 season.  McFarlane finished as the club's top point scorer in 1909 and 1910.  In 1913, McFarlane was selected to represent New South Wales and played in 3 games against Queensland.

McFarlane played with Norths up until the end of the 1915 season before retiring.  After retirement, McFarlane enlisted in the Australian Army and served in World War I.

References

North Sydney Bears players
Rugby league halfbacks
Rugby league five-eighths
New South Wales rugby league team players
1891 births
1976 deaths